The Poncha Springs Schoolhouse, at 330 Burnett St. near Poncha Springs, Colorado in Chaffee County, Colorado, was built in Italianate style during 1881–83.  It was listed on the National Register of Historic Places in 1990.  It was then the Poncha Springs Town Hall and Museum.

It is a two-story building, T-shaped in plan, built of masonry with prominent quoins and a "belvedere style" cupola / bell tower.  In 1990, the original bell was stored in the basement.

It was deemed a "town landmark" and significant "for its excellent representation of the Italianate style of architecture that is used in many masonry buildings in Chaffee County."

In 2021 it continues to hold the town hall and a museum.

References

City and town halls in Colorado
History museums in Colorado
Schools in Chaffee County, Colorado
City and town halls on the National Register of Historic Places
National Register of Historic Places in Chaffee County, Colorado
School buildings completed in 1883
School buildings on the National Register of Historic Places in Colorado